Team Bridgestone Cycling is a continental cycling team based in Japan that participates in UCI Continental Circuits races.

The team's history can be traced back to 1964, but its current incarnation as the UCI registered road-racing team Team Bridgestone-Anchor started in 2008.  For the 2012 season the team made a major change, adding several non-Japanese riders and running half their races outside Japan. For 2013, they signed Damien Monier, a French stage winner at the Giro d'Italia. During this period another Frenchman Thomas Lebas was the team leader for 5 years.

In 2018, the team changed its name to Team Bridgestone Cycling, with an all-Japanese team roster.

Team roster

Major wins

2008
Stage 8a Tour de Martinique, Masamichi Yamamoto
2009
Stage 1 Jelajah Malaysia, Makoto Iijima
Overall Tour de Okinawa, Kenji Itami
Stage 2, Kenji Itami
2010
Stage 2 Tour de Taiwan, Miyataka Shimizu
Overall Tour de Martinique, Miyataka Shimizu
Stage 7, Miyataka Shimizu
Overall Tour de Hokkaido, Miyataka Shimizu
Stage 2, Miyataka Shimizu
2011
Stage 2 Tour of the Philippines, Kazuo Inoue
2012
 Japanese National Time Trial Championships, Ryota Nishizono
2013
Tsugaike Kogen, Damien Monier
Overall Tour de Hokkaido, Thomas Lebas
Stage 2, Thomas Lebas
Tour de Okinawa, Sho Hatsuyama
2014
Overall Tour International de Sétif, Thomas Lebas
Stage 4 Tour Cycliste International de la Guadeloupe, Thomas Lebas
Stage 2 Tour de Constantine, Thomas Lebas
Stage 3 Tour de Constantine, Damien Monier
2015
Overall Tour de Filipinas, Thomas Lebas
Stage 1 Tour of Thailand, Kohei Uchima
Stage 9 Tour de Singkarak. Sho Hatsuyama
2016
 Japanese National Road Race Championships, Sho Hatsuyama
 Japanese National Time Trial Championships, Ryota Nishizono
2017
Stage 3 Tour de Kumano, Damien Monier
 Japanese National Time Trial Championships, Ryota Nishizono
Stage 1 Tour de Hokkaido, Ryu Suzuki
2018
 Japanese National Time Trial Championships, Kazushige Kuboki
2019
Stage 8 Tour of Japan, Kazushige Kuboki
Prologue Tour de Kumano, Keitaro Sawada
2022
Stage 1 & 3 Tour de Hokkaido, Shunsuke Imamura

National champions
2012
 Japan Time Trial, Ryota Nishizono

2016
 Japan Road Race, Sho Hatsuyama
 Japan Time Trial, Ryota Nishizono

2017
 Japan Time Trial, Ryota Nishizono

2018
 Japan Time Trial, Kazushige Kuboki

References

External links
 

Cycling teams based in Japan
Cycling teams established in 2008
UCI Continental Teams (Asia)